Breadcrumb trail may refer to:

 Hansel and Gretel, a fairy tale in which the eponymous characters leave a trail of breadcrumbs
 Breadcrumb navigation, a graphical control element used as a navigational aid
 Breadcrumb Trail, a 2002 rock album by The Frames
 "Breadcrumb Trail", a song by Slint from Spiderland